Wilson Homer "Bull" Elkins (July 9, 1908 – March 17, 1994) was an American educator and university administrator.

Career

Elkins served as the president of the University of Maryland from 1954 to 1970, and then was president of the 5 campus University of Maryland System from 1970-1978. Elkins received an A.B. and an M.A. from the University of Texas in 1933, where he was also a star college football quarterback. He was a Rhodes Scholar at Oxford University, where he completed a Ph.D. Elkins served as the president of San Angelo Junior College from 1938 to 1948. He left San Angelo to become president of Texas Western College in El Paso until beginning his tenure at the University of Maryland in 1954. At the University of Maryland, Elkins emphasized rigorous academic standards. In 1957, he created the "Academic Probation Plan," threatening 1,550 students—18 percent of the undergraduate enrollment—with expulsion because their grade point averages were lower than a C. University administration sent 14% of students home, but by 1964, 82% of freshmen came from the top half of their high school classes, and Phi Beta Kappa—which had turned down Maryland twice before—had established a chapter on campus.

Elkins supported the establishment of a faculty government and managed a major expansion and improvement of the physical plant, including the construction of the McKeldin Library and the Computer Science Center. Elkins resigned in 1978 at the state's mandatory retirement age of 70. The Elkins Building, constructed in 1979, is located in Adelphi, Maryland and houses the offices of the University of Maryland Central Administration.

Personal life
Elkins was born on July 9, 1908 in Medina, Texas to Willie and May (Stevens) Elkins. He married Dorothy Blackburn in June 1938, and had two daughters, Carole and Margaret. Carole had two children: Jay And Heather Neal (B.A., University of Maryland College Park).  Heather Neal Weitzel had three children: Sara, Noah and Matthew Weitzel. Margaret married Charles Thomas Frost and had four children; Jeffery (who married Michelle Boyd and had two children, Matthew Wilson and Taylor Anne), Patrick, Katherine, and Peter. After Elkins wife's passing in 1971, Elkins married Vivian Noh in 1972. Elkins died in Baltimore in March 1994.

References 

Records of the Office of the President, University of Maryland
The Coach, Time, 3 August 1959, retrieved 14 January 2009.

External links 

 Wilson H. Elkins papers at the University of Maryland libraries

Presidents of the University of Maryland, College Park
1908 births
1994 deaths
University of Texas at El Paso people
American Rhodes Scholars
American football quarterbacks
Texas Longhorns football players
20th-century American academics